Elections to Trafford Council were held on Thursday, 4 May 1978. One third of the council was up for election, with each successful candidate to serve a four-year term of office, expiring in 1982. The Conservative Party retained overall control of the council.

After the election, the composition of the council was as follows:

Ward results

References

1978 English local elections
1978
1970s in Greater Manchester